The dolphin kick is a kicking movement used in swimming. It is frequently used as part of the butterfly stroke and in underwater kicking.

See also 
 Fish kick

References 

Swimming